The 2016 Sydney Darts Masters was the fourth staging of the tournament by the Professional Darts Corporation, as a fifth entry in the 2016 World Series of Darts. The tournament featured 16 players (eight top PDC Players facing eight regional qualifiers) and was held at The Star in Sydney, Australia from 18–20 August 2016.

Phil Taylor was the three-time defending champion after defeating Adrian Lewis 11–3 in the last year's final, and he defended his title by beating Michael van Gerwen 11—9 in the final.

Qualifiers
The eight seeded PDC players were:

  Gary Anderson (quarter-finals)
  Michael van Gerwen (runner-up)
  James Wade (first round)
  Adrian Lewis (quarter-finals)
  Phil Taylor (winner)
  Dave Chisnall (semi-finals)
  Raymond van Barneveld (first round)
  Peter Wright (semi-finals)

The Oceanic qualifiers were:
  Simon Whitlock (first round)
  Kyle Anderson (quarter-finals)
  David Platt (first round)
  Corey Cadby (first round)
  Rob Szabo (first round)
  Rhys Mathewson (quarter-finals)
  Cody Harris (first round)
  Harley Kemp (first round)

Draw

Broadcasting

The tournament was available in the following countries on these channels:

References

Sydney Darts Masters
Sydney Darts Masters
World Series of Darts
Sports competitions in Sydney